Katarzyna Łaska (born 26 May 1979), known professionally as Kasia Łaska, is a Polish singer, who is best known from the Musical Theatre Roma where she starred in the lead role of Kim in the musical Miss Saigon, adult Wendy in the musical Peter Pan and Frenchy in the musical Grease. She also played Maria in the musical West Side Story at the Musical Theatre Capitol in Wrocław.

Łaska has also lent her voice to Polish versions of several animated films and cartoons.

Among her TV roles are Daring Do and Princess Cadance in My Little Pony: Friendship is Magic, Pearl in Steven Universe, and Katie in the Canadian cartoon Total Drama Island.

Łaska played the singing voice of Elsa, the Snow Queen in performing "Let It Go" (in Polish as "Mam tę moc") in the Disney animated film Frozen and its sequel, Frozen II where Kasia sings "Chcę uwierzyć snom", the Polish version of "Into the Unknown" made popular by Panic! At the Disco.

On 9 February 2020, Łaska was called to join Idina Menzel, Aurora and eight more of Elsa's international voiceovers to perform the song "Into the Unknown" during the 92nd Academy Awards. Every international performer sang one line of the song in different languages: Maria Lucia Heiberg Rosenberg in Danish, Willemijn Verkaik in German, Takako Matsu in Japanese, Carmen Sarahí in Latin American Spanish, Lisa Stokke in Norwegian, Łaska in Polish, Anna Buturlina in Russian, Gisela in European Spanish and Gam Wichayanee in Thai.

Dubbing
My Little Pony: Friendship is Magic – Princess Cadance
Winx Club: The Secret of the Lost Kingdom – Musa
Winx Club 3D: Magical Adventure – Musa
Winx Club – Tecna (Specials 1-4, Season 3 (Nickelodeon version) and Seasons 4, 5, 6 and 7), Chimera, Digit and Mielle (ZigZap)
 Winx Club: The Mystery of the Abyss – Tecna
H2O: Just Add Water – Theme music performer, Emma (voice)
Frozen – Elsa (singing voice)
Steven Universe – Pearl, Yellow Pearl, Blue Pearl.
Tweenies – Fizz
The Backyardigans – Tasha
High School Musical – Martha Cox
Frozen Fever – Elsa (singing voice)
Total Drama – Katie and Ella
Olaf's Frozen Adventure – Elsa (singing voice)
Spider-Man: Into the Spider-Verse - Rio Morales
Frozen II – Elsa (singing voice)
Beauty and the Beast – Belle (singing voice)
Over the Moon – Chang'e
Special Agent Oso - Paw Pilot

Concerto for Group and Orchestra
In 2008, Kasia met Jon Lord (Deep Purple) and he asked her to sing as a soloist in his Concerto for Group and Orchestra project for the next four years. They performed together in Germany, Luxembourg, Switzerland, Brazil, Korea, United Kingdom, Bulgaria, Russia, Ukraine, Hungary, Italy, France, and in her home city Warsaw.

Kasia was a guest at the 2011 British premiere of Jon Lord Live (recorded live in 2009) from the Concerto for Group and Orchestra concert in Romania.

Jon invited Kasia to sing on his final album of Concerto for Group and Orchestra (new studio version) from Abbey Road Studios. She featured along with Steve Balsamo, Joe Bonamassa, Darin Vasilev, Bruce Dickinson (Iron Maiden), Steve Morse (Deep Purple) and Guy Pratt (Pink Floyd). The album premiered worldwide in September 2012.

In November 2013, Kasia released the first single "For my love" from her solo music project SIRLI.

Personal life 
For several years she was associated with the actor Mateusz Damięcki. She is currently married and has a son, Henryk (born in 2016), and lives in Warsaw.

References 

 Kasia Łaska – Official Site
 SIRLI – Official Site

1979 births
Polish voice actresses
Living people
People from Tomaszów Mazowiecki
21st-century Polish singers
21st-century Polish women singers